Tân Ân Tây is a commune (xã) and village in Ngọc Hiển District, Cà Mau Province, in Vietnam. It is located on the southern coast of Vietnam.

Populated places in Cà Mau province
Communes of Cà Mau province